John Frederick "Fritz" Ferko (December 23, 1910 – January 22, 1974) was an American football tackle. 

Ferko was born in Nesquehoning, Pennsylvania, in 1910. He attended Nesquehoning High School, West Chester Teachers College, and Mount St. Mary's College. 

In 1936, he signed with the Pittsburgh Pirates of the National Football League (NFL) and attended the preseason training camp, but he was cut in late August prior to the start of the regular season. He played for the Philadelphia Eagles in 1937 and 1938. He appeared in 13 NFL games, five as a starter. In 1938, he also played for the Jersey City Giants of the American Association. 

Ferko died in 1974 at age 63.

References

1910 births
1974 deaths
Philadelphia Eagles players
American football tackles
Players of American football from Pennsylvania